Arabella Smith is a politician from the Turks and Caicos Islands.

Political career 
She was the first female minister on the territory, serving as Minister of Natural Resources from 1991 to 1994. She then served as Minister of Health, Youth and Sports.

See also 

 List of the first women holders of political offices in North America

References 

Living people
20th-century British women politicians
Turks and Caicos Islands women in politics
Turks and Caicos Islands Christians
Members of the Turks and Caicos Islands House of Assembly
Government ministers of the Turks and Caicos Islands
Women government ministers of the Turks and Caicos Islands
Year of birth missing (living people)